Richard Sammel (born 13 October 1960) is a German actor. He is best known for his role as Thomas Eichhorst on the FX television series The Strain (2014–2017).

He has appeared in more than 100 films and television series since 1991.

Personal life
Sammel speaks five languages: his native German, and English, French, Italian, and Spanish, all of which he is fluent in ('fairly fluent' in Spanish).

He currently resides in Paris and Berlin with his girlfriend and his son. He also has two daughters.

Selected filmography

Awards and nominations

References

External links 

 

1960 births
Living people
German male film actors
Male actors from Heidelberg
German male television actors
20th-century German male actors
21st-century German male actors